Delosperma sutherlandii is a dwarf perennial plant, native to South Africa. It forms a dense lawn with abundant, long-lasting flowering.  It will reach sizes of 60 cm in diameter and approximately 10–15 cm tall, with possibly the largest flowers of its type.

Cultivation and uses
It can be cultivated in a wide range of areas with a Mediterranean climate.

Sources 

sutherlandii
Entheogens
Taxa named by N. E. Brown
Taxa named by Joseph Dalton Hooker